Takiyatou Yaya (born 3 April 2000) is a Togolese footballer who plays as a midfielder for Turkish Women's Football Super League club İlkadım Belediyesi Yabancılar Pazarı Spor and the Togo women's national team.

Club career
Yaya has played for Swallows Lomé in Togo and for İlkadım in Turkey.

International career
Yaya capped for Togo at senior level during the 2022 Africa Women Cup of Nations qualification.

References

External links
 

2000 births
Living people
Sportspeople from Lomé
Togolese women's footballers
Women's association football midfielders
İlkadım Belediyespor players
Turkish Women's Football Super League players
Togo women's international footballers
Togolese expatriate footballers
Togolese expatriate sportspeople in Turkey
Expatriate women's footballers in Turkey